Besa Chitto Creek is a stream in the U.S. state of Mississippi. It is a tributary to the Yockanookany River with a name derived from the Choctaw language meaning "blackberry big creek".

References

Rivers of Mississippi
Rivers of Choctaw County, Mississippi
Mississippi placenames of Native American origin